Olagbegi Atanneye I was a paramount ruler of Owo Kingdom, Ondo state, southwestern Nigeria who reigned between 1913 and 1938. He was the brother of Olowo Ajike Ogunoye and son of Olowo Olagbegi Atanneye II

References

Yoruba monarchs
Nigerian traditional rulers
People from Owo
Olagbegi family